Ismael Mokadem (Arabic: إسماعيل مقدم; born 26 July 1995) is a Moroccan professional footballer who plays as a centre-back for Botola club Raja Club Athletic and the Morocco national team.

Early life
Ismael Mokadem was born on 26 July 1995 in Bouznika. He later joined the youth team of Wifaq Bouznika before moving to the U20 team of Hassania Ben Slimane in 2014.

Club career

Debut
In 2016, at the age of 21, he made his professional debut with Widad Temara in Botola 2.

At the end of the 2016-2017 season, where he played all the games and became the team captain, he's close to join Fath Union Sports but the move failed.

RS Berkane
During the summer of 2018, he passed a test with Raja Club Athletic and did not convince the Spaniard coach Juan Carlos Garrido. In August, he signed a four-year contract with RS Berkane. He quickly became a starter under Mounir Jaouani and played the final of the 2018 Throne Cup on 18 November 2018 against Wydad de Fès. After 120 minutes (2-2), he scores during the penalty shoot-out and the Berkanais managed to win their first title.

He participated several times in the Confederation Cup. During the 2018-2019 season, he reached the final of this competition, before losing on penalties against Zamalek SC. He played 16 games in this Cup. The following season, he ended up winning the competition by beating Egyptian club Pyramids FC in the final (1-0). This time around, he takes part in 14 games, with two assists delivered against the Zambian side Zanaco FC.

On 20 May 2022, he won the Confederation Cup for the second time by beating Orlando Pirates FC on penalties (draw, 1-1).

Raja Club Athletic
On 15 July 2022, he finally joined Raja CA as a free agent and signed a three-year contract. On October 19, he made his debut with the Eagles against Hassania Agadir alongside Marouane Hadhoudi in the defense.

International career
On 21 September 2019, he received his first selection with the Morocco A' team, against Algeria, under Hussein Ammouta.

Honours
RS Berkane
 Moroccan Throne Cup: 2018
 CAF Confederation Cup: 2020, 2022; runner-up: 2021
 CAF Super Cup runner-up: 2021

References

1995 births
Living people
Moroccan footballers
Association football defenders
Raja CA players
RS Berkane players
Association football central defenders
2020 African Nations Championship players
Morocco A' international footballers